Elena Kvitchenko Cockerell (born  1967) is a former pair skater who represented the Soviet Union. With Rashid Kadyrkaev, she is the 1986 Prize of Moscow News champion, the 1987 Winter Universiade champion, the 1987 Skate Canada International silver medalist, and a three-time Soviet national bronze medalist.

Kvitchenko/Kadyrkaev were coached by Tamara Moskvina. After retiring from competition, the pair toured with Dorothy Hamill's Ice Capades.

Kvitchenko married American figure skater Mark Cockerell, with whom she has a daughter, Anya (born in 1999).
And a son, Nicolas (born in 1995).

Competitive highlights 
With Kadyrkaev

References 

1960s births
Soviet female pair skaters
Living people
Soviet emigrants to the United States
Universiade medalists in figure skating
Universiade gold medalists for the Soviet Union
Competitors at the 1987 Winter Universiade